Ahmadabad-e Pol Abgineh (also Romanized as Aḩmadābād-e Pol Ābgīneh; also known as Aḩmadābād) is a village in Balyan Rural District, in the Central District of Kazerun County, Fars Province, Iran. At the 2006 census, its population was 713, in 143 families.

References 

Populated places in Kazerun County